Edward Vail, Sr. (1717-1777) was a Revolutionary War  Colonel of the Edenton District Minutemen and Brigadier General Edenton District Brigade in North Carolina.  Prior to the war, he was a captain in the Chowan County militia during the French and Indian War, as well as member of the Chowan County Courts and represented Chowan County in the Province of North Carolina General Assembly from 1754 to 1762, 1770 to 1771, and 1773 to 1774.  He was a member of the North Carolina Committee of Correspondence, which was formed in December 1773.

Military service
 Captain in the Chowan County militia during the French and Indian War (1754-1763)
 September 9, 1775, commissioned as a colonel in the North Carolina militia
 Commander of the Edenton District Minutemen (1775-1776)
 May 4, 1776, commissioned as a Brigadier General in the North Carolina militia
 Commander of the Edenton District Brigade of Militia (1776-1777)

References

North Carolina militiamen in the American Revolution
People from Chowan County, North Carolina
1717 births
1777 deaths
Militia generals in the American Revolution